3-Methyl-3-octanol (systematically named 3-methyloctan-3-ol) is an organic compound with the chemical formula CH3(CH2)4C(CH3)(CH2CH3)OH (also written as ). This simple tertiary alcohol is a clear colourless liquid under standard conditions, and is tasteless.

It is used in the food industry as a flavouring agent as it contributes to the flavour of roast beef. It is known to be biochemically produced by the Antrodia camphorata fungus. 3-Methyl-3-octanol is a chiral compound, with each isomer yielding a different flavour.

References 

Nonanols
Tertiary alcohols